Khost rebellion may refer to:  

 Khost rebellion (1856–1857)
 Khost rebellion (1912)
 Khost rebellion (1924–1925)